Samah may refer to:

Sanya, also known as Samah, city in Hainan, China
Samah, Iran, village in South Khorasan Province, Iran
Samah people, subgroup of Bajau people

Person
Borhan Abu Samah (1964–1999), Singaporean footballer
Hamzah Abu Samah (1924–2012), Malaysian politician
Shahurain Abu Samah (born 1986), Malaysian footballer